Patcharee Deesamer (born March 2, 1989, in Surin) is a Thai indoor volleyball player. She is a current member of the Thailand women's national volleyball team.

Awards

Individuals 
 2011–12 Thailand League "Best Blocker"

Clubs
 2012–13 Thailand League -  Champion, with Idea Khonkaen
 2013 Thai-Denmark Super League -  Champion, with Idea Khonkaen

References

External links
 FIVB Profile

1989 births
Living people
Patcharee Deesamer
Patcharee Deesamer
Patcharee Deesamer